Norman Leslie Robert Franks (born 1940) is an English militaria writer who specialises in aviation topics. He focuses on the pilots and squadrons of World Wars I and II.

Biography
He published his first book in 1976. He was an Organisation and Methods Officer with the Nationwide Building Society in London before he retired. He now lives in Bexhill-on-Sea, East Sussex, with his wife Heather. They have two sons, Rob and Mike, and five grandchildren.

He was a consultant for the Channel 4 television series Dogfight: The Mystery of the Red Baron. His 1995 book on the Red Baron has been published and reissued by three publishers.  He is also one of the founding members of the Cross and Cockade society for World War I aviation historians, which was formed in 1970, and a member of Over the Front, the league of World War I aviation historians.

In total, he has authored over 120 books covering military aviation.

Published works
Franks, Norman. Double Mission: Fighter Pilot and SOE Agent, Manfred Czernin (1976, William Kimber, London) 
Franks, Norman. Fighter Leader: The Story of Wing Commander Ian Gleed, DSO, DFC (1978, William Kimber, London) 
Franks, Norman. The Greatest Air Battle: Dieppe, 19 August 1942 (1979, William Kimber, London)  
Franks, Norman. Wings of Freedom:Twelve Battle of Britain Pilots (1980, William Kimber, London)  
Franks, Norman. Sky Tiger: The Story of Sailor Malan (1980, William Kimber, London)  
Franks, Norman. The Battle of the Airfields: 1 January 1945 (1982 & 2002, Grub Street, London)  &  [Operation Bodenplatte]	
Franks, Norman. The Air Battle of Dunkirk (1983, William Kimber, London)  
Franks, Norman and Sheddan, C. J. Tempest Pilot (1983 & 2003, Grub Street, London)  
Franks, Norman. Typhoon Attack (1984, William Kimber, London) 
Franks, Norman. Aircraft versus Aircraft: The illustrated story of fighter pilot combat since 1914 (1986). Grub Street. American ed. was issued by Macmillan  192 pages. 
 Franks, Norman; Forever strong: The story of 75 Squadron RNZAF, 1916-1990 (1991) Random Century 
 Franks, Norman; Bailey, Frank. Over the Front: A Complete Record of the Fighter Aces and Units of the United States and French Air Services, 1914-1918 (1992). Casemate Pub 
 Franks, Norman; Giblin, Hal; and McCrery, Nigel. Under the Guns of the Red Baron - The Complete Record of Von Richthofen's Victories and Victims Fully Illustrated (1995 & 2007, Grub Street, London)  (1998 & 1999, Barnes & Noble, USA) (2000, Caxton, London). 224 pages. 
 Franks, Norman; Guest, Russell; Bailey, Frank. Bloody April… Black September (1995). Grub Street. 314 pages [The two deadliest months for Allied airmen in WW I, April 1917 & September 1918].
 Franks, Norman.  Who Downed the Aces in WWI? (1996). Grub Street.
 Franks, Norman; Guest, Russell; and Alegi, Gregory. Above the War Fronts: The British Two-Seater Bomber Pilot and Observer Aces, the British Two-Seater Fighter Observer Aces, and the Belgian, Italian, Austro-Hungarian and Russian Fighter Aces 1914-1918 (1997). Grub Street. 218 pages. 
 Franks, Norman. The Greatest Air Battle: Dieppe, 19th August 1942 (1997).  Grub Street 
 Franks, Norman; Bennett, Alan.  The Red Baron's Last Flight: a Mystery Investigated (1997).  Grub Street.  Reissued as a paperback in 2006 
 Franks, Norman; Bailey, Frank. The Storks: The Story of the Les Cigognes, France's Elite Fighter Group of WWI (1998). Grub Street. 160 pages. 
 Franks, Norman; Bailey, Frank; Duiven, Rick. Casualties of the German Air Service 1914-20: As Complete a List as Possible Arranged Alphabetically and Chronologically (1999). Grub Street. 362 pages. 
 Franks, Norman; Holmes, Tony. Albatros Aces of World War I (Osprey Aircraft of the Aces No 32) (2000). Motorbooks International. 96 pages. 
 Franks, Norman. Nieuport Aces of World War I (Osprey Aircraft of the Aces No 33) (2000). Motorbooks International. 96 pages. 
 Franks, Norman; Wyngarden, Greg Van; Holmes, Tony. Fokker Dr I Aces of World War I (Osprey Aircraft of the Aces No 40) (2001). Osprey Aviation. 96 pages.
 Franks, Norman. Buck McNair : Canadian Spitfire ace : the story of Group Captain R.W. McNair DSO, DFC & 2 bars, Ld'H, CdG, RCAF (2001, 2005). Grub Street 
 Franks, Norman; Giblin, Hal. Under the Guns of the Kaiser's Aces: Bohme, Muller, Von Tutschek, Wolff : The Complete Record of Their Victories and Victims (2003). Grub Street. 192 pages. 
 Franks, Norman. Sopwith Camel Aces of World War 1 (Aircraft of the Aces, 52) (2003). Osprey Publishing (UK). 96 pages.
 Franks, Norman; Holmes, Tony. Sopwith Triplanes Aces of World War 1 (Aircraft of the Aces, 62) (2004). Osprey Publishing (UK). 96 pages. 
 Franks, Norman. Jasta Boelcke: The History of Jasta 2, 1916-1918 (2004). Grub Street. 224 pages.
 Franks, Norman. Ton-up Lancs: a Photographic Record of the Thirty-five RAF Lancasters that Each Completed One Hundred Sorties (2005).Grub Street 
 Franks, Norman. Sopwith Pup Aces of World War 1. (2005). Osprey Publishing  
 Franks, Norman. British and American Aces of World War I: the Pictorial Record.  (2005) Schiffer Military History  
 Franks, Norman. Frank 'Chota' Carey : the story of Group Captain Frank Carey CBE DFC AFC DFM. (2006) Grub Street

External links
 Interview Channel 4 History
 Biography at Grub Street Press
 Author Profile at Osprey
 Titles (to 2008) at Stone & Stone, retrieved 22 May 2013

Historians of World War I
Historians of World War II
Air force historians
British military writers
1940 births
Living people
People from Bexhill-on-Sea
20th-century British historians
20th-century British male writers
21st-century British historians
21st-century British male writers
British male non-fiction writers